DXHM (549 AM) is a radio station owned and operated by the Roman Catholic Diocese of Mati. The studio is located inside the St. John of the Cross Clergy, Brgy. Madang, Mati, Davao Oriental.

References

Catholic radio stations
Radio stations established in 1969
Radio stations in Davao Oriental